242 (two hundred [and] forty-two) is the natural number following 241 and preceding 243.

242 is the smallest integer to start a run of four consecutive integers with the same number of divisors.

242 is a nontotient since there is no integer with 242 coprimes below it.

242 is a palindrome.

242 is the number of parallelogram polyominoes with 8 cells.

References

Integers